The 2018 Asia Rugby Women's Sevens Series was the nineteenth edition of Asia's continental sevens tournament. The series will be played over three legs in Hong Kong, South Korea, and Sri Lanka.

The top two teams that are not already core teams on the 2018–19 World Rugby Women's Sevens Series will earn qualification to the 2019 Hong Kong Women's Sevens for a chance to earn core team status for the following World Series.

Teams

Hong Kong

The tournament was held 14–15 September in Hong Kong. All times in Hong Kong Time (UTC+08:00).

Pool stage

Pool C

Pool D

Knockout stage

Plate

Cup

South Korea
The tournament was held 29–30 September in Incheon. All times in Korea Standard Time (UTC+09:00).

Pool stage

Pool C

Pool D

Knockout stage

Plate

Cup

Sri Lanka

The tournament will be held 13–14 October  in Colombo. All times in Sri Lanka Standard Time (UTC+05:30).

Pool stage 

Pool C

Pool D

Knockout stage 

Plate

Cup

Final standings

See also
 2018 Asia Rugby Sevens Series
 2019 Hong Kong Women's Sevens

References

2018
2018 rugby sevens competitions
2018 in Asian rugby union
2018 in women's rugby union
International rugby union competitions hosted by Hong Kong
International rugby union competitions hosted by South Korea
International rugby union competitions hosted by Sri Lanka
rugby union
rugby union
rugby union